Smoky Mountain Times is a weekly newspaper based in Bryson City, North Carolina which is published on Thursdays and has served the people of Swain County, North Carolina since 1883.

References

Weekly newspapers published in North Carolina
Swain County, North Carolina